RSI Rete Uno is the principal radio channel of the Swiss public-service broadcasting organization Radio Svizzera Italiana, which launched in 1933 as Radio Monte Ceneri.

Broadcasting in Italian, it is receivable throughout Switzerland (as well as southern Germany) via FM, DAB, cable, and satellite. Until 31 June 2008 (when SRG SSR ceased broadcasting on the 558 kHz medium-wave frequency) it could also be received in large areas of northern and central Italy.

The station identifies itself on-air as "Radio Svizzera - Rete Uno". On FM Bands, it identifies itself as "RETE UNO" The director of RSI Rete Uno is Edy Salmina.

External links 
 

Radio stations established in 1936
Italian-language radio stations in Switzerland
1936 establishments in Switzerland